Raya may refer to:

Places
Raya (country subdivision), administrative unit of the Ottoman Empire
Raya, Uttar Pradesh, India
Raya, Simalungun, a town in Indonesia
Raya, Nepal, a village in NW Nepal
La Raya, a village in Murcia, Spain
Raya Azebo, a woreda in Ethiopia

People with the surname
Javier Raya (born 1991), Spanish figure skater
Joseph Raya, Melkite Greek Catholic archbishop
Krishnadeva Raya, Vijayanagara Emperor, South India
David Raya, Spanish footballer

Other uses 
 Raya and Sakina, Egyptian serial killers
 Raya (app), a dating app
 Rayah or Raya, a member of the tax-paying lower class in the Ottoman Empire
 Raya, title of a monarch, a cognate of Raja
 Raya (Smallville), a fictional character in the TV series Smallville
 Raya (ራያ ቢራ), a brand of beer sold in Ethiopia
 Raya and the Last Dragon, a 2021 Disney animated film about a Southeast Asian warrior
 Raya, the protagonist of the 2021 film, Raya and the Last Dragon.
 Raya (given name)

See also
Hari Raya or Eid al-Fitr, a religious holiday celebrated by Muslims
Raisa (disambiguation)
Raja (disambiguation)